Benjamin Cowen may refer to:

 Benjamin S. Cowen (1793–1860), U.S. Representative from Ohio
 Benjamin R. Cowen (1831–1908), Union Army general and politician in Ohio